Scotorythra gomphias is a moth of the family Geometridae. It was first described by Edward Meyrick in 1899. It is endemic to the Hawaiian islands of Oahu, Molokai, Maui and Hawaii.

The larvae feed on Bobea, Pisonia and Straussia species.

References

G
Endemic moths of Hawaii
Biota of Maui
Biota of Oahu
Moths described in 1899